Dal is a railway station located in Dal in Eidsvoll, Norway. The station is located upon the Trunk Line and was opened in 1854. The station is served by commuter trains with hourly services to Oslo Central Station and Drammen Station, a service which Dal functions as the terminal station for.

External links
 Jernbaneverket's page on Dal 

Railway stations in Eidsvoll
Railway stations on the Trunk Line
Railway stations opened in 1854
1854 establishments in Norway